The Be'er Sheva fringe-fingered lizard (Acanthodactylus beershebensis) is a species of lizard in the family Lacertidae. It is a member of the subfamily Lacertinae, and the genus Acanthodactylus (spiny footed lizards). Considered a separate species based on morphological distinction and isolated location, it shares a large portion of its genetics with Acanthodactylus pardalis in this genus. Many of the individual species in this genus are similar, but varying coloration explains why each species has been separated. Like all Acanthodactylus, A. beershebensis lays eggs, varying from three to seven eggs at a time. The species is endemic to the loess scrublands of the Negev desert in Israel and the Palestinian Territories, a biodiversity hotspot.

A. beershebensis was declared critically endangered after an assessment in 2006 due to a serious population decline. Some estimates claim numbers have declined 80% over the last three generations. The small populations are severely fragmented across the Negev desert. This decline has been caused by habitat destruction and degradation. Conservation efforts also damaged the population, but a small portion of their original range remains untouched and protected.

Appearance and offspring 
The hatchlings of A. beershebensis have a bright blue tail and dark and yellowish stripes on the body. However, a few weeks after birth, the tail becomes brownish gray, and the body turns to a blotchy brownish, sand-gray coloration, which remains through adulthood. This pattern gives the name to the "Acanthodactylus pardalis group" to which A. beershebensis belongs. (In Greek, pardalis, means leopard). On average, the species live less than a year, hatching around the end of May.

Colorful tails
All Acanthodactylus species (A. longipes, A. scutellatus, A. beershebensis, A. boskianus, A. schreiberi ) that change tail colour after a few weeks after birth also go through behavioural changes. However, the changes can differ between species; an example would be in foraging movements. Colourful tails and striped patterns on lizards may be used as anti-predator mechanisms. In the early stages of life of Acanthodactylus beershebensis''', its colourful tail may be used to "shoo off" predators. After its tail changes colour, the lizard becomes less vulnerable to predators, thus not needing it anymore.

Geographic range and habitatA. beershebensis live only in south-central Israel. Its natural habitat is tropical dry shrubland. It generally lives in the loess plains of the northern Negev desert located in Israel and Palestine territory. The Be'er Sheva fringe-fingered lizard is the most common species in this habitat. The area that the species inhibits is less than 10 km2 (3.9 sq mi) in size and the species lives randomly distributed throughout the area. The Be'er Sheva fringe-fingered lizard lives in a structurally simple environment with few perches in which the species can hide from its predators. The species live in an area where trees and other covers are scarce and avoids them because they are often already inhabited by predators. The Be'er Sheva fringe-fingered lizard does not rely much on the perches or covers provided by trees for survival but is known to show the strongest reaction to plantations.

The habitat of the northern Negev desert is one where a more complex or a higher quality habitat would do more harm than improve the lives of its natural inhabitants. A higher quality habitat would only bring in more predatory species into the area, severely affecting the population of the Be'er Sheva fringe-fingered lizard as well as other local species.Hawlena, Dror; Saltz, David; Abramsky, Zvika; Bouskila, Amos (2010). "Ecological Trap for Desert Lizards Caused by Anthropogenic Changes in Habitat Structure That Favor Predator Activity". Conservation Biology 24.3: 803-809. Print.

Behavior and diet
The diet of A. beershebensis is influenced by the amount and severity of its predation. Because the species face a lot of threat from the many predators inhabiting the area, the Be'er Sheva fringe-fingered lizard has found ways to adapt its diet dependent to its predatory situation. When under more than normal pressure from predators, the Be'er Sheva fringe-fingered lizard moves around less and catches and consumes smaller prey and less plant material. Its diet shifts toward consuming foods that take less time to catch and to eat, all in preparation for possible predators. The reptile also becomes less selective and eats a more diverse range of food when under this predatory pressure.

ConservationA. beershebensis is a critically endangered species, partly due to an ecological trap created by the conservation of plant biomass and species richness within its habitat. The conservation plan constructed pits and planted trees in order to reduce resource leakage in the ecosystem. When trees are planted in perch-less habitats it increases the number of avian predators and gives them a hunting advantage. This manipulating of the habitat made it less suitable for the lizard and heightened its chance of predation. The Be'er Sheva fringe-fingered lizard disappeared from its natural and altered habitats 11 years after the construction of the conservation plan. The spatial uncommonness of natural perches and man-made perches hindered the lizard's ability to correlate perches with a low quality habitat. Thus, the rapid increases in the number of available perches lead the lizard to perceive its natural habitat to be as risky as its altered habitat, creating an equal-preference ecological trap.

Threats
Threats for the Be'er Sheva fringe-fingered lizard include habitat destruction and predation. Intensive agriculture, urbanization, and grazing animals are the factors contributing to the destruction of the lizard's home. It is also easily caught by birds, like falcons and egrets, whose numbers are increasing due to continued tree planting in its niche.

Conservation efforts
The national legislation in Israel currently protects a small area of the former habitat of A. beershebensis.

Taxonomy
While A. beershebensis is considered critically endangered, its similar genetic cousin A. pardalis'' is not.  Studies have shown many of these species are so genetically similar that they all share similar threats.  Since these species are all facing similar threats, all of them should share the same critically endangered label to preserve the diversity.  Conservation efforts will be focused on the endemic species, meaning further research is need to sort out this genus to properly focus efforts.

References

Acanthodactylus
Reptiles of the Middle East
Reptiles described in 1999
Taxa named by Jiří Moravec (herpetologist)
Taxa named by Sherif M. Baha El Din
Taxa named by Yehudah L. Werner
Taxonomy articles created by Polbot